This is a list of members of the Tasmanian Legislative Council between 1921 and 1927. Terms of the Legislative Council did not coincide with Legislative Assembly elections, and members served six year terms, with a number of members facing election each year.

Elections

Members

Notes
  On 17 October 1924, David Calvert, the member for Huon, died five months into his term. His brother William Calvert won the resulting by-election on 2 December 1924.
  On 12 April 1925, James Chapman, one of the three members for Hobart, died. Charles Eady won the resulting by-election on 23 June 1925.
  On 29 May 1925, James Murdoch (senior), the member for Pembroke died. His son James Murdoch (junior) won the resulting by-election on 28 July 1925.
  On 12 May 1926, John Hope, the member for Meander, died. Hubert Nichols won the resulting by-election on 20 July 1926.

Sources
 
 Parliament of Tasmania (2006). The Parliament of Tasmania from 1856

Members of Tasmanian parliaments by term
20th-century Australian politicians